Corfe is a surname, and may refer to:

 Arthur Corfe (1878–1949), New Zealand rugby union player
 Charles Corfe (1843–1921), Bishop in Korea
 Charles Corfe (headmaster) (1847–1935), New Zealand cricketer and headmaster
 Joffa Corfe (born 1964), Australian rules football supporter
 Melissa Corfe (born 1986), South African swimmer